Bathymophila micans is a species of sea snail, a marine gastropod mollusk in the family Solariellidae.

Description
The height of the shell attains 7 mm, its diameter 7½ mm. The rather thin shell is narrowly perforated and has a trochiform shape. The white surface is very shining with nacreous reflections. The conic spire occupies half of the length. It contains five slightly convex whorls, separated by a well-marked suture. At the top of each whorl, close to the suture, there is a very narrow, decurrent zone with many longitudinal striae. These end at the angle at the limit of the zone in a series of small tubercles. The rest of the surface shows feeble growth lines. At the base of the body whorl there is a very feeble granular row bordering the umbilical region. The aperture is subquadrangular. The broad columella is feebly arcuate and ends with a blunt tooth. The outer lip is thin.

Distribution
This marine species occurs in European waters at bathyal depths (861 m to 1385 m) off the Azores; also on the Galicia Bank (Northeast Atlantic Ocean)

References

External links
  Serge GOFAS, Ángel A. LUQUE, Joan Daniel OLIVER,José TEMPLADO & Alberto SERRA (2021) - The Mollusca of Galicia Bank (NE Atlantic Ocean); European Journal of Taxonomy 785: 1–114

micans
Molluscs of the Atlantic Ocean
Gastropods described in 1896